The FRAP (Popular Action Front) was a Chilean left-wing coalition of parties from 1956 to 1969. It presented twice a common candidate, Salvador Allende, for the 1958 and the 1964 presidential elections. Succeeding to the FRENAP formed the preceding year, the FRAP itself was succeeded by the Popular Unity coalition.

Composition of the coalition 

The FRAP succeeded to the FRENAP (Frente Nacional del Pueblo, People's National Front), formed the following year by a coalition of the Socialist Party (PS) and the Communist Party (PCCh). The new coalition, created on February 28, 1956, as a platform of movements struggling for an "anti-imperialist, anti-oligarch and anti-feudal program." Apart from the Socialist and the Communist parties, the FRAP included: the Popular Socialist Party (until its merger in 1957 with the PS; the People's Democratic Party (Partido Democrático del Pueblo), which merged in 1960 with the PS to form the PADENA (which in turn withdrew itself from the FRAP coalition in 1965); the Vanguardia Nacional del Pueblo (National Vanguard of the People), which had been created in 1958 from a merger of minor groups such as the Labour Party (1953) and others; and the Social Democrat, founded in 1965.

Strategy 

Despite their alliances, tensions separated the Socialists and the Communists. For the first one, the coalition was a "Workers' Front", formed exclusively of working classes' parties struggling to defend their interests, while for the latter, it was rather a "National Liberation Front," that is a legal means to accede to power through elections, in alliance with "bourgeois parties" such as the Radical Party and the Christian Democrat Party who would united in a common national emancipation program and social and political democratization program.

See also
Democratic Front of Chile (its right-wing opponent)
Presidential Republic Era (1924-1973)

1956 establishments in Chile
1969 disestablishments in Chile
Communist Party of Chile
Defunct left-wing political party alliances
Defunct political party alliances in Chile
Presidential Republic (1925–1973)
Chile